La Castañeda are a Mexican rock group originally from México City, formed in 1989 by Salvador Moreno, Edmundo Ortega, Alberto Rosas, Omar D'León, Oswaldo D'León y Juan Blendl.

Discography 
 Servicios Generales (1989)
 Servicios Generales II (1992)
 Globo Negro (1994)
 El Hilo de Plata (1996)
 Trance (1999)
 Galería Acústica (2004)
 Llama Doble (2006)
 La otra llama (2010)

External links
Official website

Castaneda